Leopold George, Hereditary Prince of Hesse-Homburg (25 October 1654 in Bingenheim – 26 February 1675 in Schleswig-Holstein), was a German nobleman and the heir apparent to the Landgraviate of Hesse-Homburg from his birth. After his father, William Christoph, sold most of Homburg to his younger brother George Christian in 1669, Leopold George became Hereditary Prince of Hesse-Homburg-Bingenheim.

He predeceased his father by 6 years, meaning that he never became Landgrave himself.  Leopold George never married, and had no legitimate issue.

House of Hesse
1654 births
1675 deaths
17th-century German people
Heirs apparent who never acceded
Sons of monarchs